Mikhail V. Novitsky (born  17 December 1963) is a  Russian actor, singer/songwriter and guitarist,  who  fronts the rock band  "SP Babai " (Saint Petersburg), which he formed in 1993 from the ashes of his first band "Avtobus". He is also the organizer of the Vladimir Vysotsky singer-songwriter festival "Lampushka" since 2001. Apart from music, he is an active member of his preservationist group "Green Wave", which he set up to protect St. Petersburg parks and lakes.

Discography
 1996 — «Free flight».
 1997 — «With a badge in the head.».
 1999 — «Flying star».
 2000 — «SP Babai the Best».
 2001 — «Lyrical album».
 2002 — «Tale about King Arlis».
 2002 — «Whack in the heart».
 2003 — «Stebalovo».
 2004 — «The main song about the different».
 2007 — «In the middle of life».
 2007 — «Our Vysotsky» (concert-performance, DVD + Book).

Participation in Russian political protest movement
Mikhail Novitsky is a regular participant of the protest movement in Russia. From the middle of the zero's he constantly played at meetings of the democratic opposition in St. Petersburg, where he performed critical songs of his own devoted to the Russian authorities, especially Russian President Vladimir Putin. His song “Putin, skiing, Magadan” in recent years has become the unofficial anthem of the protest movement in St. Petersburg. Putin's regime cancels his concerts in Russia regularly because of irreconcilable political position of Mikhail Novitsky.

See also
 In St. Petersburg Vysotsky Birthday prepared to do the impossible, January 25, 2006
 St. Peterburg remembers Vladidmir Vysotsky, Russkiy Mir Foundation, 22.07.2010
 Free Pussy Riot Fest A Success in St. Petersburg, The Moscow Times, September 13, 2012, by Sergei Chernov

Notes

1963 births
Living people
Russian male singer-songwriters
Russian singer-songwriters